Volazaha is a monotypic moth genus of the family Erebidae. Its only species, Volazaha iridoplitis, is found on Madagascar. Both the genus and the species were first described by Pierre Viette in 1971.

References

Calpinae
Monotypic moth genera